Fernando Carlo (also known as Cope2) is an artist from the Kingsbridge section of the Bronx, New York.

Early life
He has been a graffiti artist since 1985. Cope2's cousin "Chico 80" influenced Cope into writing. In 1982, he made his own crew called Kids Destroy, eventually changing to Kings Destroy after he dubbed himself "King of the 4 Line".

Cope2's "throw-up" was given to him by Cap to use until he had enough skills to create his own.

Career 
Some of Cope2's initial commercial artwork has been sold at Christie's for $1000 USD per painting. Early work includes cover art for a Boogie Down Productions album titled Sex and Violence.

In 2002, Cope2 provided artwork for Adam Bhala Lough's Bomb the System, including a piece on the Brooklyn Bridge. He can be seen on the DVD's behind the scenes footage painting one of the pieces at the end of the film.

In 2003, Cope2's book entitled Cope2: True Legend was published by Righters.com.

In 2005, Cope2 collaborated with and designed a pair of sneakers for Converse under the "Chuck Taylor All-Stars" line.

Also in 2005, Time magazine commissioned Cope2, for $20,000 USD, to paint a billboard ad in the SoHo district of Manhattan, on Houston and Wooster. The ad depicts the magazines cover with graffiti tags scrawled over it; the text reads "Post-Modernism? Neo-Expressionism? Time. Know Why".
In 2006, Cope2 appeared in Marc Ecko's video game, Marc Ecko's Getting Up: Contents Under Pressure. He features as one of the "graffiti legends" who gives the protagonist advice on the graffiti world. Cope2's "throw-up" has also appeared on walls in the videogame GTA IV and in the movie Shrek The Third.

In 2008, Cope2 collaborated with Adidas and Footlocker to release a collection of clothes and accessories in Europe. The collection included baseball caps, jackets, T-shirts, sweaters, belts and sneakers.

Legal Issues

Cope2 has been arrested numerous times for drugs, vandalism and violence.

Cope2 was arrested and charged with two counts of felony mischief and one count of graffiti in September 2010 on suspicion of vandalizing subway cars in a tunnel in uptown Manhattan in 2009. The arrest took over a year as he was abroad. On June 27, 2012 he took a plea agreement in exchange for a conditional discharge.

In 2015, Cope2 was arrested again for allegedly pulling a gun on fellow artist, Hector Nazario, whose graffiti name is HOW at the Bowery Graffiti Wall in New York City.

Controversy

Cope2 has a problematic and documented history of making homophobic, racist, threatening and misogynist rants online. In 2014, Cope2 unveiled a pride based mural at the Bowery Graffiti Wall in New York City, which was met with criticism from victims of his abuse, including Vandalog editor RJ Rushmore, who shared numerous homophobic and violent Tweets and Instagram posts that Cope2 had made in the past.

References

External links
 
 Curbs and Stoops Interactive Gallery: Cope2
 Liquidteks Magazine Interview with Cope2
 Cope2 in The Strip Gallery (IT)
 Cope2 in The Strip Gallery (EN)

American graffiti artists
People from the Bronx
Year of birth missing (living people)
Living people
Artists from the Bronx